I Wish I Could Have Loved You More is the début album by British pop musician Candie Payne.

Background

Tracks 4 and 8 feature backing vocals by Payne's brother Sean Payne, his fiancee Abi Harding and Russell Pritchard, all of the Zutons.

Track listing
All songs written by Candie Payne and Simon Dine
 "I Wish I Could Have Loved You More" – 3:33
 "Why Should I Settle for You" – 4:01
 "Take Me" – 2:27
 "In the Morning" – 3:06
 "All I Need to Hear" – 2:45
 "A Different You" – 3:52
 "By Tomorrow" – 3:31
 "One More Chance" – 2:46
 "Hey Goodbye" – 3:16
 "Seasons Change" – 1:50
 "Turn Back Now" – 3:10

Personnel
 Candie Payne – vocals

Production
 Simon Dine – producer
 Jessica Corcoran – engineer
 Ion Metsovitis – engineer
 Matthew Edge – vocal engineer
 Serge Krebs – assistant engineer
 Mike Hedges – mixing
 Craig Silvey – mixing
 Richard Wilkinson – mixing
 John Brough – vocal mixing
 John Davis – mastering

Additional musicians
 Abi Harding – backing vocals
 Sean Payne – backing vocals
 Russell Pritchard – backing vocals

Cover versions
Emma Bunton covered "I Wish I Could Have Loved You More" on her 2019 album My Happy Place.

References

Candie Payne albums
2007 debut albums
Deltasonic albums